Atkinsons Dam is a rural locality in the Somerset Region, Queensland, Australia. In the  Atkinsons Dam had a population of 205 people.

Geography 
Atkinson Dam  occupies most of the locality.

The northern boundary of the locality is marked by Buaraba Creek, a tributary of Lockyer Creek.

History
Atkinson's Lagoon Provisional School opened on 6 August 1885. On 1 January 1909, it was upgraded to a State School. It closed in 1968. It was located near the intersection of the south-west corner of the present Atkinsons Dam Road and Rocky Creek Road.

In the  Atkinsons Dam had a population of 205 people.

References

External links

Suburbs of Somerset Region
Localities in Queensland